Meleager of Gadara (fl. 1st century BC) was a poet and collector of epigrams. He wrote some satirical prose, now lost, and some sensual poetry, of which 134 epigrams survive.

Life

Meleager was the son of Eucrates, born in the city of Gadara, now Umm Qais in Jordan, which was then a partially Hellenized community noted for its "remarkable contribution to Greek culture". He was educated in Tyre and spent his later life in Cos where he died at an advanced age, perhaps at 70. According to short autobiographical poems he wrote, Meleager was proud of his hometown and identified himself as cosmopolitan, being both "Attic" (i.e. Hellenistic) and Syrian, and also praised Tyre for having "made [him] a man" and Cos for taking "care of [him] in [his] old age".

The scholiast to the Palatine manuscript of the Greek Anthology says he flourished in the reign of Seleucus VI Epiphanes (95 – 93 BC). The uppermost date of his compilation of the Anthology is 60 BC, as it did not include Philodemus of Gadara, though later editors added thirty-four epigrams.

Some writers classed him among the Cynics, and according to historian Benjamin Isaac Meleager's belief that "all men are equal and compatriots" strengthens this view, as some Cynics already held such a world view possibly as early as the 5th century BC. Like his compatriot Menippus, Meleager wrote what were known as spoudogeloia, satirical prose essays putting philosophy in popular form with humorous illustrations. These are completely lost. Meleager's fame is securely founded on the one hundred and thirty-four epigrams of his own which he included in his Anthology. The manuscripts of the Greek Anthology are the sole source of these epigrams.

The Garland of Meleager
Meleager is famous for his anthology of poetry entitled The Garland. Polemon of Ilium and others had created collections of monumental inscriptions, or of poems on particular subjects earlier, but Meleager first did so comprehensively. He collected epigrams by 46 Greek poets, from every lyric period up to his own. His title referred to the commonplace comparison of small beautiful poems to flowers, and in the introduction to his work, he attached the names of various flowers, shrubs, and herbs—as emblems—to the names of the several poets. The Garland itself has survived only as one of the original constituent roots to the Greek Anthology.

Poetry
Meleager's poetry is concerned with personal experience and emotions, frequently with love and its discontents. He typically describes himself not as an active and engaged lover, but as one struck by the beauty of a woman or boy. The following is an example:

References

Bibliography

Texts and translations 
The Greek Anthology I (Loeb Classical Library) W. R. Paton (1916) Cambridge MA: Harvard University Press; London: Heinemann) [Original Greek with facing page English translations]
Select Epigrams from the Greek Anthology. J. W. Mackail (1890) Longmans, Green & Co. [English translations]
The Greek Anthology. Charles Neaves (1874) New York: John B. Alden [English translations and commentary]

Secondary sources 

Smith, Philip (1867) "Meleager"; "Planudes". In William Smith (ed.) Dictionary of Greek and Roman Biography and Mythology. 3. Boston: Little, Brown & Co.

Further reading
 The Greek Anthology: Hellenistic Epigrams Edited by A.S.F. Gow and D.L. Page (2 vols., 1965 Cambridge U.P.) [Ancient Greek text, English translations, detailed commentary]
The Greek Anthology and Other Ancient Greek Epigrams. Peter Jay (1974) Ann Arbor MI: University of Michigan Press [English translations]
 Meleager, The Poems of Meleager Tr. Peter Wigham, Peter Jay. (1975. Anvil Press) 
 Meleager, Meleager: The Poems Tr. Jerry Clack (1992. Bolchazy-Carducci)

External links
 Meleager of Gadara: translation of all surviving epigrams at attalus.org; adapted from W. R. Paton (1916–18)

1st-century BC poets
Ancient Greek anthologists
Ancient Greek poets
Cynic philosophers
Hellenistic-era people
Roman-era Greeks
Epigrammatists of the Greek Anthology